Oliver J. Coleman (born 1844–May 29, 1926) was a state legislator representing Madison County, Florida, during the Reconstruction era. In 1873 he was elected in a special election to represent the 10th Senatorial District.

He served in the Florida House of Representatives in 1871 and 1872 and won a special election to represent the 10th District in the Florida Senate in December 1873.

References

Members of the Florida House of Representatives
People from Madison County, Florida
1844 births
1926 deaths